Two prisons are located in Vacaville, California, United States:

 California Medical Facility (CMF) 
 California State Prison, Solano 

These two prisons are located together at the base of several hills on the outskirts of Vacaville. These prisons are also located fairly close to Travis Air Force Base.

See also
 List of California state prisons

References

Law enforcement in the San Francisco Bay Area
Prisons in California
Buildings and structures in Solano County, California